This is a list of the Russian moth species of the superfamily Gelechioidea. It also acts as an index to the species articles and forms part of the full List of moths of Russia.

Ethmiidae
Ethmia angarensis Caradja, 1939
Ethmia aurifluella (Hübner, 1810)
Ethmia bipunctella (Fabricius, 1775)
Ethmia candidella (Alphéraky, 1908)
Ethmia chrysopyga (Zeller, 1844)
Ethmia chrysopygella (Kolenati, 1846)
Ethmia cirrhocnemia (Lederer, 1872)
Ethmia comitella Caradja, 1927
Ethmia discrepitella (Rebel, 1901)
Ethmia dodecea (Haworth, 1828)
Ethmia ermineella Walsingham, 1880
Ethmia fumidella (Wocke, 1850)
Ethmia haemorrhoidella (Eversmann, 1844)
Ethmia maracandica (Rebel, 1901)
Ethmia nigrimaculata Sattler, 1967
Ethmia nigripedella Erschoff, 1877
Ethmia pusiella (Linnaeus, 1758)
Ethmia pyrausta (Pallas, 1771)
Ethmia quadrillella (Goeze, 1783)
Ethmia quadripunctella (Eversmann, 1844)
Ethmia septempunctata (Christoph, 1882)
Ethmia sibirica Danilevsky, 1975
Ethmia soljanikovi Danilevsky & Zagulajev, 1975
Ethmia turkmeniella Dubatolov & Ustjuzhanin, 1998
Ethmia ubsensis Zagulajev, 1975
Ethmia ultima Sattler, 1967
Ethmia vidua (Staudinger, 1879)
Ethmia vittalbella (Christoph, 1877)
Ethmia xanthopleura Meyrick, 1931
Ethmia zaguljaevi Kostjuk, 1980

Depressariidae
Agonopterix abditella Hannemann, 1959
Agonopterix abjectella (Christoph, 1882)
Agonopterix adspersella (Kollar, 1832)
Agonopterix agyrella (Rebel, 1917)
Agonopterix alstromeriana (Clerck, 1759)
Agonopterix angelicella (Hübner, [1813])
Agonopterix anticella (Erschoff, 1877)
Agonopterix archangelicella (Caradja, 1920)
Agonopterix arctica (Strand, 1902)
Agonopterix arenella ([Denis & Schiffermüller], 1775)
Agonopterix assimilella (Treitschke, 1832)
Agonopterix astrantiae (Heinemann, 1870)
Agonopterix atomella ([Denis & Schiffermüller], 1775)
Agonopterix bipunctifera (Matsumura, 1931)
Agonopterix broennoeensis (Strand, 1920)
Agonopterix capreolella (Zeller, 1839)
Agonopterix carduella (Hübner, [1817])
Agonopterix caucasiella Karsholt, Lvovsky & Nielsen, 2006
Agonopterix ciliella (Stainton, 1849)
Agonopterix cnicella (Treitschke, 1832)
Agonopterix conterminella (Zeller, 1839)
Agonopterix costaemaculella (Christoph, 1882)
Agonopterix curvipunctosa (Haworth, 1811)
Agonopterix divergella (Caradja, 1920)
Agonopterix doronicella (Wocke, 1849)
Agonopterix dubatolovi Lvovsky, 1995
Agonopterix encentra (Meyrick, 1914)
Agonopterix erythrella (Snellen, 1884)
Agonopterix exquisitella (Caradja, 1920)
Agonopterix ferocella (Chrétien, 1910)
Agonopterix furvella (Treitschke, 1832)
Agonopterix galbella Hannemann, 1959
Agonopterix heracliana (Linnaeus, 1758)
Agonopterix hypericella (Hübner, [1817])
Agonopterix intersecta (Filipjev, 1929)
Agonopterix irrorata (Staudinger, 1870)
Agonopterix kaekeritziana (Linnaeus, 1767)
Agonopterix kuznetzovi Lvovsky, 1983
Agonopterix lacteella (Caradja, 1920)
Agonopterix laterella ([Denis & Schiffermüller], 1775)
Agonopterix liturosa (Haworth, 1811)
Agonopterix l-nigrum (Matsumura, 1931)
Agonopterix melancholica (Rebel, 1917)
Agonopterix multiplicella (Erschoff, 1877)
Agonopterix mutuurai Saito, 1980
Agonopterix nervosa (Haworth, 1811)
Agonopterix ocellana (Fabricius, 1775)
Agonopterix ochrocephala Saito, 1980
Agonopterix omelkoi Lvovsky, 1985
Agonopterix ordubadensis Hannemann, 1959
Agonopterix pallidior (Stringer, 1930)
Agonopterix pallorella (Zeller, 1839)
Agonopterix parilella (Treitschke, 1835)
Agonopterix probella Hannemann, 1953
Agonopterix propinquella (Treitschke, 1835)
Agonopterix purpurea (Haworth, 1811)
Agonopterix quadripunctata (Wocke, 1858)
Agonopterix rimantasi Lvovsky, 1985
Agonopterix rimulella (Caradja, 1920)
Agonopterix rubrovittella (Caradja, 1926)
Agonopterix rutana (Fabricius, 1794)
Agonopterix sapporensis (Matsumura, 1931)
Agonopterix senecionis (Nickerl, 1864)
Agonopterix septicella (Snellen, 1884)
Agonopterix sinevi Lvovsky, 1984
Agonopterix subpropinquella (Stainton, 1849)
Agonopterix subtakamukui Lvovsky, 1998
Agonopterix subumbellana Hannemann, 1959
Agonopterix sumizome Fujisawa, 1985
Agonopterix sutschanella (Caradja, 1926)
Agonopterix takamukui (Matsumura, 1931)
Agonopterix tarkiella Lvovsky, 2001
Agonopterix tolli Hannemann, 1959
Agonopterix yeatiana (Fabricius, 1781)
Agonopterix yomogiella Saito, 1980
Depressaria absynthiella Herrich-Schäffer, 1865
Depressaria albipunctella ([Denis & Schiffermüller, 1775)
Depressaria altaica Zeller, 1854
Depressaria artemisiae Nickerl, 1864
Depressaria atrostrigella Clarke, 1941
Depressaria badiella (Hübner, 1796)
Depressaria cervicella Herrich-Schäffer, 1854
Depressaria chaerophylli Zeller, 1839
Depressaria colossella Caradja, 1920
Depressaria depressana (Fabricius, 1775)
Depressaria dictamnella (Treitschke, 1835)
Depressaria discipunctella Herrich-Schäffer, 1854
Depressaria djakonovi Lvovsky, 1981
Depressaria douglasella Stainton, 1849
Depressaria emeritella Stainton, 1849
Depressaria falkovitshi Lvovsky, 1990
Depressaria filipjevi Lvovsky, 1981
Depressaria fuscovirgatella Hannemann, 1967
Depressaria golovushkini Lvovsky, 1995
Depressaria hannemanniana Lvovsky, 1990
Depressaria hofmanni Stainton, 1861
Depressaria hystricella Moschler, 1860
Depressaria indecorella Rebel, 1917
Depressaria irregularis Matsumura, 1931
Depressaria kostjuki Lvovsky, 1998
Depressaria leucocephala Snellen, 1884
Depressaria libanotidella Sch lager, 1849
Depressaria marcella Rebel, 1901
Depressaria olerella Zeller, 1854
Depressaria pimpinellae Zeller, 1839
Depressaria pulcherrimella Stainton, 1849
Depressaria radiella (Goeze, 1783)
Depressaria rubricella ([Denis & Schiffermüller], 1775)
Depressaria sibirella Lvovsky, 1981
Depressaria silesiaca Heinemann, 1870
Depressaria sordidatella Tengstrom, 1848
Depressaria subalbipunctella Lvovsky, 1981
Depressaria taciturna Meyrick, 1910
Depressaria ultimella Stainton, 1849
Eutorna leonidi Lvovsky, 1979
Exaeretia allisella Stainton, 1849
Exaeretia amurella Lvovsky, 1990
Exaeretia boreella Lvovsky, 1990
Exaeretia ciniflonella (Lienig & Zeller, 1846)
Exaeretia culcitella (Herrich-Schäffer, 1854)
Exaeretia daurella Lvovsky, 1998
Exaeretia fuscogriseella Hannemann, 1990
Exaeretia indubitatella (Hannemann, 1971)
Exaeretia lechriosema (Meyrick, 1928)
Exaeretia lepidella (Christoph, 1872)
Exaeretia mongolicella (Christoph, 1882)
Exaeretia niviferella (Christoph, 1872)
Exaeretia praeustella (Rebel, 1917)
Exaeretia sutschanensis (Hannemann, 1953)
Exaeretia ussuriella (Caradja, 1920)
Lamprystica igneola Stringer, 1930
Levipalpus hepatariella (Lienig & Zeller, 1846)
Luquetia lobella ([Denis & Schiffermüller], 1775)
Luquetia orientella (Rebel, 1893)
Orophia denisella ([Denis & Schiffermüller], 1775)
Orophia ferrugella ([Denis & Schiffermüller], 1775)
Orophia sordidella (Hübner, 1796)
Semioscopis avellanella (Hübner, 1793)
Semioscopis japonicella Saito, 1989
Semioscopis oculella (Thunberg, 1794)
Semioscopis similis Saito, 1989
Semioscopis steinkellneriana ([Denis & Schiffermüller], 1775)
Semioscopis strigulana ([Denis & Schiffermüller], 1775)

Peleopodidae
Acria emarginella (Donovan, 1806)
Letogenes festalis Meyrick, 1930

Elachistidae
Atrinia olgae Sinev, 1992
Biselachista abiskoella (Bengtsson, 1977)
Biselachista albidella (Nylander, 1848)
Biselachista bipunctella Sinev & Sruoga, 1995
Biselachista cinereopunctella (Haworth, 1828)
Biselachista contaminatella (Zeller, 1847)
Biselachista devexella (Kaila, 2003)
Biselachista eleochariella (Stainton, 1851)
Biselachista juliensis (Frey, 1870)
Biselachista kebneella Traugott-Olsen & Nielsen, 1977
Biselachista pusillella Sinev & Sruoga, 1995
Biselachista scirpi (Stainton, 1887)
Biselachista serricornis (Stainton, 1854)
Biselachista tersella Sinev & Sruoga, 1995
Biselachista trapeziella (Stainton, 1849)
Biselachista utonella (Frey, 1856)
Cosmiotes bifurcatella Sinev & Sruoga, 1995
Cosmiotes cornutifera Sruoga, 1995
Cosmiotes exactella (Herrich-Schäffer, 1855)
Cosmiotes freyerella (Hübner, 11825])
Cosmiotes pravella Sinev & Sruoga, 1995
Cosmiotes stabilella (Stainton, 1858)
Dibrachia kalki (Parenti, 1978)
Elachista acutella Kaila, 2003
Elachista adelpha Kaila & Jalava, 1994
Elachista adscitella Stainton, 1851
Elachista albifrontella (Hübner, [1817])
Elachista alpinella Stainton, 1854
Elachista anitella Traugott-Olsen, 1985
Elachista anserinella Zeller, 1839
Elachista apicipunctella Stainton, 1849
Elachista arduella Kaila, 2003
Elachista argentella (Clerck, 1759)
Elachista atricomella Stainton, 1849
Elachista baikalica Kaila, 1992
Elachista bedellella (Sircom, 1848)
Elachista biatomella (Stainton, 1848)
Elachista bifasciella Treitschke, 1833
Elachista bimaculata Parenti, 1981
Elachista bisetella Sinev & Sruoga, 1995
Elachista bisulcella (Duponchel, 1843)
Elachista caliginosa Parenti, 1983
Elachista canapennella (Hübner, [1813])
Elachista canis Parenti, 1983
Elachista chamaea Kaila, 2003
Elachista chrysodesmella Zeller, 1850
Elachista cingillella (Herrich-Schäffer, 1855)
Elachista coloratella Sinev & Sruoga, 1995
Elachista constitella Frey, 1859
Elachista diederichsiella Hering, 1889
Elachista dispilella Zeller, 1839
Elachista dispunctella (Duponchel, 1843)
Elachista dubitella Sinev & Sruoga, 1995
Elachista elegans Frey, 1859
Elachista ermolenkoi Sinev & Sruoga, 1995
Elachista falaxella Sinev & Sruoga, 1995
Elachista fasciola Parenti, 1983
Elachista flavescens Parenti, 1981
Elachista fumosella Sinev & Sruoga, 1995
Elachista fuscofrontella Sruoga, 1990
Elachista galactitella (Evcrsmann, 1844)
Elachista gangabella Zeller, 1850
Elachista gibbera Kaila, 2003
Elachista gleichenella (Fabricius, 1781)
Elachista gormella Nielsen & Traugott-Olsen, 1987
Elachista griseella (Duponchel, 1842)
Elachista habeleri Traugott-Olsen, 1990
Elachista hedemanni Rebel, 1899
Elachista heringi Rebel, 1899
Elachista herrichii Frey, 1859
Elachista humilis Zeller, 1850
Elachista jaskai Kaila, 1998
Elachista kilmunella Stainton, 1849
Elachista lambeseella Nielsen & Traugott-Olsen, 1987
Elachista latebrella Sinev & Sruoga, 1995
Elachista leifi Kaila & Kerppola, 1992
Elachista littoricola Le Marchand, 1938
Elachista lugdunensis Frey, 1859
Elachista luticomella Zeller, 1839
Elachista maculicerusella Bruand, 1859
Elachista manni Traugott-Olsen, 1990
Elachista martinii Hofmann, 1898
Elachista megagnathos Sruoga, 1990
Elachista microdigitata Parenti, 1983
Elachista multidentella Sinev &, Sruoga, 1995
Elachista nielswolffi Svensson, 1976
Elachista nigrothoracella Sinev & Sruoga, 1995
Elachista nitensella Sinev & Sruoga, 1995
Elachista nitidulella (Herrich-Schäffer, 1855)
Elachista nobilella Zeller, 1839
Elachista nolckeni Sulcs, 1992
Elachista obliquella Stainton, 1854
Elachista olschwangi Kaila, 2003
Elachista opacella Sinev & Sruoga, 1995
Elachista optatella Sinev & Sruoga, 1995
Elachista orientella Sinev & Sruoga, 1995
Elachista ornithopodella Frey, 1859
Elachista orstadii Palm, 1943
Elachista parasella Traugott-Olsen, 1974
Elachista pigerella (Herrich-Schäffer, 1854)
Elachista planicara Kaila, 1998
Elachista poae Stainton, 1855
Elachista pollinariella Zeller, 1839
Elachista pollutella Duponchel, 1843
Elachista pomerana Frey, 1870
Elachista pullicomella Zeller, 1839
Elachista quadripunctella (Hübner, [1825])
Elachista regificella Sircom, 1849
Elachista revinctella Zeller, 1850
Elachista ripula Kaila, 1998
Elachista rudectella Stainton, 1851
Elachista rufella Sinev & Sruoga, 1995
Elachista sagittiferella Sinev & Sruoga, 1995
Elachista sasae Sinev & Sruoga, 1995
Elachista simplimorphella Sinev & Sruoga, 1995
Elachista spumella Caradja, 1920
Elachista squamosella (Duponchel, 1843)
Elachista subalbidella Schlager, 1847
Elachista subnigrella Douglas, 1853
Elachista subocellea (Stephens, 1834)
Elachista szocsi Parenti, 1978
Elachista tetragonella (Herrich-Schäffer, 1855)
Elachista tinctella Sinev & Sruoga, 1995
Elachista unifasciella (Haworth, 1828)
Elachista vonschantzi Svensson, 1976
Elachista zernyi Hartig, 1941
Hemiprosopa altaica Sinev, 1998
Hemiprosopa dasycara Kaila, 1998
Mendesia farinella (Thunberg, 1794)
Perittia andoi Kuroko, 1982
Perittia herrichiella (Herrich-Schäffer, 1855)
Perittia sibirica Sinev, 1992
Perittia unicolorella Sinev, 1992
Perittia unifasciella Sinev, 1992
Perittoides ochrella Sinev, 1992
Stephensia abbreviatella (Stainton, 1851)
Stephensia jalmarella Kaila, 1992
Stephensia ussuriella Sinev, 1992

Agonoxenidae
Blastodacna atra (Hawotth, 1828)
Blastodacna hellerella (Duponchel, 1838)
Blastodacna mandshurica Sinev, 1986
Chrysoclista lathmella T. B. Fletcher, 1936
Chrysoclista linneela (Clerck, 1759)
Dystebenna stephensi (Stainton, 1849)
Haplochrois coleophorella (Sinev, 1993)
Haplochrois kuznetzovi (Sinev, 1986)
Haplochrois monomorpha (Sinev, 1986)
Haplochrois ochrella (Sinev, 1986)
Haplochrois orientella (Sinev, 1979)
Haplochrois theae (Kusnezov, 1916)
Heinemannia festivella ([Denis & Schiffermüller], 1775)
Heinemannia laspeyrella (Hübner, 1796)
Microcolona aurantiella Sinev, 1988
Spuleria auriscapella Sinev, 1988
Spuleria flavicaput (Haworth, 1828)
Spuleria fulvifrontella Sinev, 1986
Trachydora ussuriella Sinev, 1981

Scythrididae
Eretmocera medinella (Staudinger, 1859)
Parascythris muelleri (Mann, 1871)
Scythris acipenserella Nupponen & Nupponen, 2000
Scythris aegrella Nupponen & Junnilainen, 2000
Scythris albisaxella Nupponen & Nupponen, 2000
Scythris albosuffusella Nupponen, 2007
Scythris ammobia Falkovitsh, 1972
Scythris amphonycella ([Geyer], 1836)
Scythris anomaloptera (Staudinger, 1880)
Scythris apotomella Nupponen, 2007
Scythris arenicola Nupponen, 2005
Scythris arkaimensis Bengtsson, 2000
Scythris bagdadiella Amse1, 1949
Scythris barguzinensis Bengtsson & Liska, 1996
Scythris bengtssoni Patocka & Liska, 1989
Scythris bifissella (Hofmann, 1889)
Scythris braschiella (Hofmann, 1898)
Scythris brunneofasciella Nupponen & Junnilainen, 2000
Scythris buraetica Nupponen, 2007
Scythris cassiterella (Snellen, 1884)
Scythris cervella Nupponen & Nupponen, 2001
Scythris clavella (Zeller, 1855)
Scythris complexa Sinev, 2001
Scythris cretacella Nupponen & Nupponen, 2000
Scythris cuspidella ([Denis & Sch1ffermuller], 1775)
Scythris dahurica Sinev, 2001
Scythris disparella (Tengstrom, 1848)
Scythris eevae Nupponen, 2007
Scythris elenae Nupponen, 2000
Scythris emichi (Anker, 1870)
Scythris ericetella (Heinemann, 1872)
Scythris erinacella Nupponen, 2003
Scythris eversmanni Nupponen & Nupponen, 2000
Scythris fallacella (Sch1ager, 1847)
Scythris felixi Bengtsson & Sutter, 1996
Scythris fissurella Bengtsson, 1996
Scythris flavilaterella (Fuchs, 1886)
Scythris flaviventrella (Herrich-Schäffer, 1855)
Scythris fuscoaurella Bengtsson & Liska, 1996
Scythris fuscopterella Bengtsson, 1977
Scythris gorbunovi Nupponen, 2003
Scythris gozmanyi Passerin d'Entreves, 1986
Scythris grandipennis (Haworth, 1828)
Scythris gravatella (Ze11er, 1847)
Scythris hamardabanica Nupponen, 2003
Scythris hamatella Nupponen & T.Nupponen, 2001
Scythris heikkii Nupponen, 2007
Scythris hemicycliella Nupponen, 2005
Scythris immaculatella (Chambers, 1875)
Scythris inconspicuella Sinev, 2001
Scythris inertella (Zeller, 1855)
Scythris inspersella (Hübner, [1817])
Scythris jakutica Sinev, 2001
Scythris jalavai Sinev, 1993
Scythris kasyi Hannemann, 1962
Scythris knochella (Fabricius, 1794)
Scythris kullbergi Bengtsson, 1997
Scythris kyzylensis Bengtsson, 1997
Scythris laminella ([Denis & Schiffermüller], 1775)
Scythris lativalvella Sinev, 2001
Scythris limbella (Fabricius, 1775)
Scythris luxatiella Nupponen & Kaitila, 2000
Scythris lvovskyi Sinev, 2001
Scythris macrourella Sinev, 2001
Scythris maculata Sinev, 2001
Scythris malozemovi Nupponen, 2003
Scythris maritimella Sinev, 2001
Scythris mikkolai Sinev, 1993
Scythris minorella Sinev, 2001
Scythris nigridorsella Nupponen, 2007
Scythris ninae Nupponen, 2003
Scythris nitidella Bengtsson & Liska, 1996
Scythris noricella (Zeller, 1843)
Scythris obscurella (Scopoli, 1763)
Scythris olschwangi Nupponen & Nupponen, 2000
Scythris omelkoi Sinev, 2001
Scythris orientella Sinev, 2001
Scythris palustris (Zeller, 1855)
Scythris pascuella (Zeller, 1855)
Scythris paullella (Herrich-Schäffer, 1855)
Scythris penicillata Chrétien, 1900
Scythris perlucidella Nupponen & Nupponen, 2000
Scythris picaepennis (Haworth, 1828)
Scythris potatorella Nupponen, 2003
Scythris productella (Zeller, 1839)
Scythris pudorinella (Moschler, 1866)
Scythris remexella Nupponen & Kaitila, 2000
Scythris satyrella Staudinger, 1880
Scythris seliniella (Zeller, 1839)
Scythris setiella (Zeller, 1870)
Scythris sibirella Sinev, 2001
Scythris sinensis (R.Felder & Rogenhofer, 1875)
Scythris sinnevi Nupponen, 2003
Scythris spinella Nupponen & Nupponen, 2001
Scythris subaerariella (Stainton, 1867)
Scythris subcassiterella Bengtsson, 1997
Scythris sublaminella Nupponen & Nupponen, 2000
Scythris terekholensis Bengtsson, 1997
Scythris tributella (Zeller, 1847)
Scythris tumidella Nupponen &, Nupponen, 2001
Scythris ustjuzhanini Sachkov & Sinev, 2001

Xyloryctidae
Epichostis abrupta (Omelko, 1995)
Pantelamprus staudingeri Christoph, 1882

Chimabachidae
Dasystoma kurentzovi (Lvovsky, 1990)
Dasystoma salicella (Hübner, 1796)
Diurnea fagella (Denis & Schiffermüller, 1775)
Diurnea lipsiella (Denis & Schiffermüller, 1775)
Diurnea soljanikovi Lvovsky, 1986

Oecophoridae
Aplota palpella (Haworth, 1828)
Bisigna procerella ([Denis & Schiffermüller], 1775)
Borkhausenia fuscescens (Haworth, 1828)
Borkhausenia luridicomella (Herrich-Schäffer, 1856)
Borkhausenia minutella (Linnaeus, 1758)
Buvatina iremella Junnilainen & Nupponen, 1999
Callimodes heringii (Lederer, 1864)
Callimodes zelleri (Christoph, 1882)
Carcina luridella (Christoph, 1882)
Carcina quercana (Fabricius, 1775)
Crassa tinctella (Hübner, 1796)
Crassa unitella (Hübner, 1796)
Dasycera oliviella (Fabricius, 1794)
Decantha borkhausenii (Zeller, 1839)
Denisia augustella (Hübner, 1796)
Denisia coeruleopicta (Christoph, 1888)
Denisia luticiliella (Erschoff, 1877)
Denisia obscurella (Brandt, 1937)
Denisia similella (Hübner, 1796)
Denisia stipella (Linnaeus, 1758)
Denisia stroemella (Fabricius, 1779)
Deuterogonia chionoxantha (Meyrick, 1931)
Deuterogonia pudorina (Wocke, 1857)
Endrosis sarcitrella (Linnaeus, 1758)
Epicallima conchylidella (Snellen, 1884)
Epicallima formosella ([Denis & Schiffermüller], 1775)
Epicallima gerasimovi (Lvovsky, 1984)
Epicallima nadezhdae (Lvovsky, 1985)
Epicallima subsuzukiella (Lvovsky, 1985)
Fabiola pokornyi (Nickerl, 1864)
Harpella forticella (Scopoli, 1763)
Hofmannophila pseudospretella (Stainton, 1849)
Holoscolia huebneri Kodak, 1980
Martyringa ussuriella Lvovsky, 1979
Martyringa xeraula (Meyrick, 1910)
Metalampra caucasica Lvovsky, [1994]
Metalampra cinnamomea (Zeller, 1839)
Minetia crinitus (Fabricius, 1798)
Oecophora bractella (Linnaeus, 1758)
Pleurota aorsella Christoph, 1872
Pleurota aristella (Linnaeus, 1767)
Pleurota bicostella (Clerck, 1759)
Pleurota contignatella Christoph, 1872
Pleurota cumaniella Rebel, 1907
Pleurota kostjuki Lvovsky, 1990
Pleurota malatya Back, 1973
Pleurota monotonia Filipjev, 1924
Pleurota neurograpta Filipjev, 1929
Pleurota pungitiella Herrich-Schäffer, 1854
Pleurota pyropella (Denis & Schiffermüller, 1775)
Pleurota sibirica Rebel, 1901
Pleurota tuvella Lvovsky, 1992
Promalactis ermolenkoi Lvovsky, 1986
Promalactis jezonica (Matsumura, 1931)
Promalactis parki Lvovsky, 1986
Promalactis sinevi Lvovsky, 1986
Promalactis svetlanae Lvovsky, 1985
Promalactis venustella (Christoph, 1882)
Pseudocryptolechia sareptensis (Moschler, 1862)
Schiffermuelleria schaefferella (Linnaeus, 1758)

Lecithoceridae
Lecithocera chersitis Meyrick, 1918
Lecithocera nigrana (Duponchel, 1836)
Odites kollarella (Costa, 1832)
Odites notocapna Meyrick, 1925
Rhizosthenes falciformis Meyrick, 1935
Scythropiodes choricopa (Meyrick, 1931)
Scythropiodes issikii (Takahashi, 1930)
Scythropiodes ussuriella Lvovsky, 1996
Scythropiodes xenophaea (Meyrick, 1931)

Stathmopodidae
Atkinsonia swetlanae Sinev, 1988
Atrijuglans hetaohei Yang, 1977
Calicotis griseella Sinev, 1988
Calicotis luteella Sinev, 1988
Cuprina flaviscapella Sinev, 1988
Cuprina fuscella Sinev, 1988
Hieromantis kurokoi Yasuda, 1988
Stathmopoda flavescens Kuznetzov, 1984
Stathmopoda hexatyla Meyrick, 1907
Stathmopoda opticaspis Meyrick, 1931
Stathmopoda pedella (Linnaeus, 1761)
Thylacosceloides miniata Sinev, 1988

Batrachedridae
Batrachedra albicapitella Sinev, 1986
Batrachedra arenosella Walker, 1864
Batrachedra auricomella Sinev, 1993
Batrachedra chasanella Sinev, 1993
Batrachedra ochricomella Sinev, 1993
Batrachedra pinicolella (Zeller, 1839)
Batrachedra praeangusta (Haworth, 1828)

Coleophoridae
Agapalsa idaeella (Hofmann, 1869)
Agapalsa lusciniaepennella (Treitschke, 1833)
Agapalsa vacciniella (Herrich-Schäffer, 1861)
Amselghia alhagii (Falkovitsh, 1972)
Amselghia argyrella (Herrich-Schäffer, 1856)
Amselghia azishtella Anikin, 1998
Amselghia balkara Falkovitsh & Jalava, 1997
Amselghia felixella (Baldizzone, 1994)
Amselghia fringillella (Zeller, 1839)
Amselghia rectilineella (Fischer von Röslerstamm, [1843])
Amselghia subnivea (Fi1ipjev, 1925)
Amseliphora niveicostella (Zeller, 1839)
Apista adelpha Falkovitsh, 1979
Apista albostraminata (Toll, 1960)
Apista callipepla Falkovitsh, 1979
Apista dignella (Toll, 1961)
Apista gallipennella (Hübner, 1796)
Apista impalella (Toll, 1961)
Apista lacera Falkovitsh, 1993
Apista rebeli (Gerasimov, 1930)
Apocopta exlentii Anikin, 2005
Aporiptura dissecta Falkovitsh, 1989
Aporiptura eurasiatica (Baldizzone, 1989)
Aporiptura hamata (Falkovitsh, 1972)
Aporiptura hypoxantha Falkovitsh, 1982
Aporiptura klimeschiella (Toll, 1952)
Aporiptura lonchodes Falkovitsh, 1994
Aporiptura macilenta (Falkovitsh, 1972)
Aporiptura nigridorsella (Amsel, 1935)
Aporiptura ochroflava (Toll, 1961)
Aporiptura ofaistoni Anikin, 2005
Aporiptura physophorae Falkovitsh, 1994
Ardania albicostella (Duponchel, 1842)
Ardania bilineatella (Zeller, 1849)
Ardania colutella (Fabricius, 1794)
Ardania discordella (Zeller, 1849)
Ardania genistae (Stainton, 1857)
Ardania onobrychiella (Zeller, 1849)
Ardania saturatella (Stainton, 1850)
Ardania sergiella Falkovitsh, 1979
Ardania trifariella (Zeller, 1849)
Ardania vulpecula (Zeller, 1849)
Argyractinia kautzi (Rebel, 1933)
Argyractinia necessaria (Staudinger, 1880)
Argyractinia ochrea (Haworth, 1828)
Ascleriducta lithargyrinella (Zeller, 1849)
Atractula glycyrrhizae Falkovitsh, 1989
Augasma aeratella (Zeller, 1839)
Augasma atraphaxidellum Kuznetzov, 1957
Bima arctostaphyli (Meder, 1933)
Bourgogneja pennella ([Denis & Schiffermüller], 1775)
Calcomarginia ballotella (Fischer von Röslerstamm, [1839])
Carpochena aequalella (Christoph, 1872)
Carpochena armeniae (Baldizzone & Patzak, 1991)
Carpochena arta Falkovitsh, 1979
Carpochena asperginella (Christoph, 1872)
Carpochena atlanti Anikin, 2005
Carpochena binotapennella (Duponchel, 1843)
Carpochena carchara (Falkovitsh, 1972)
Carpochena ceratoidis Falkovitsh, 1979
Carpochena crassa Falkovitsh, 1989
Carpochena crepidinella (Zeller, 1847)
Carpochena diogenes (Falkovitsh, 1970)
Carpochena echinacea (Falkovitsh, 1972)
Carpochena lativittella (Erschoff, 1877)
Carpochena macrura (Falkovitsh, 1972)
Carpochena orotavensis (Rebel, 1896)
Carpochena pellicornella (Zerny, 1930)
Carpochena pilicornis (Rebel, 1914)
Carpochena preisseckeri (Toll, 1942)
Carpochena salicorniae (Heinemann & Wocke, 1876)
Carpochena squalorella (Zeller, 1849)
Carpochena teheranella (Baldizzone, 1994)
Carpochena trientella (Christoph, 1872)
Carpochena tsherkesi (Falkovitsh, 1970)
Carpochena unipunctella (Zeller, 1849)
Carpochena weymarni (Toll, 1942)
Casas albella (Thunberg, 1788)
Casas zernyi (Toll, 1944)
Casignetella absinthii (Wocke, 1876)
Casignetella adelogrammella (Zeller, 1849)
Casignetella albicans (Zeller, 1849)
Casignetella albilineella (Toll, 1960)
Casignetella albulae (Frey, 1880)
Casignetella amarchana (Falkovitsh, 1975)
Casignetella amellivora (Baldizzone, 1979)
Casignetella ammophora Falkovitsh, 1989
Casignetella ancistron (Falkovitsh, 1976)
Casignetella arenifera Falkovitsh, 1989
Casignetella argentula (Stephens, 1834)
Casignetella artemisicolella (Bruand, [1855])
Casignetella burmanni (Toll, 1952)
Casignetella ciconiella (Herrich-Schäffer, 1855)
Casignetella clarissa Falkovitsh, 1977
Casignetella corsicella (Walsingham, 1898)
Casignetella darigangae Falkovitsh, 1976
Casignetella dentatella (Toll & Amsel, 1967)
Casignetella derasofasciella (Klimesch, 1952)
Casignetella deviella (Zeller, 1847)
Casignetella dianthi (Herrich-Schäffer, 1855)
Casignetella diplodon Falkovitsh, 1993
Casignetella directella (Zeller, 1849)
Casignetella discifera (Falkovitsh, 1976)
Casignetella eltonica Anikin, 2005
Casignetella erratella (Toll & Amsel, 1967)
Casignetella expressella (Klemensiewicz, 1883)
Casignetella exul Falkovitsh, 1992
Casignetella falkovitshella (Vives, 1984)
Casignetella filaginella (Fuchs, 1881)
Casignetella follicularis (Vallot, 1802)
Casignetella galatellae (Hering, 1942)
Casignetella galbulipennella (Zeller, 1838)
Casignetella gardesanella (Toll, 1953)
Casignetella genviki Anikin, 2002
Casignetella gnaphalii (Zeller, 1839)
Casignetella graminicolella (Heinemann, 1876)
Casignetella granulatella (Zeller, 1849)
Casignetella hackmani (Toll, 1953)
Casignetella heihensis (Li & Zhang, 2000)
Casignetella hsiaolingensis (Toll, 1942)
Casignetella hyssopi (Toll, 1961)
Casignetella inulae (Wocke, 1876)
Casignetella koreana (Baldizzone, 1989)
Casignetella kudrosella (Baldizzone & Oku, 1988)
Casignetella kyffhusana (Petry, 1898)
Casignetella lebedella Falkovitsh, 1982
Casignetella linosyridella (Fuchs, 1880)
Casignetella loxodon Falkovitsh, 1993
Casignetella microdon Falkovitsh, 1993
Casignetella millefolii (Zeller, 1849)
Casignetella moronella (Falkovitsh, 1975)
Casignetella morosa Falkovitsh, 1993
Casignetella nanophyti (Falkovitsh, 1975)
Casignetella napolovi (Baldizzone & Savenkov, 2002)
Casignetella niveistrigella (Wocke, 1876)
Casignetella nubivagella (Zeller, 1849)
Casignetella nutantella (Muhlig & Frey, 1857)
Casignetella occatella (Staudinger, 1880)
Casignetella opulens Falkovitsh, 1977
Casignetella palifera Falkovitsh, 1977
Casignetella paripennella (Zeller, 1839)
Casignetella parki (Baldizzone & Savenkov, 2002)
Casignetella peisoniella (Kasy, 1965)
Casignetella peribenanderi (Toll, 1943)
Casignetella pilion Falkovitsh, 1992
Casignetella pseudociconiella (Toll, 1952)
Casignetella pseudodirectella (Toll, 1959)
Casignetella pseudorepentis (Toll, 1960)
Casignetella ramosella (Zeller, 1849)
Casignetella raphidon (Baldizzone & Savenkov, 2002)
Casignetella remizella (Baldizzone, 1983)
Casignetella riffelensis (Rebel, 1913)
Casignetella saponariella (Heeger, 1848)
Casignetella saratovi Anikin, 2005
Casignetella scabrida (Toll, 1959)
Casignetella silenella (Herrich-Schäffer, 1855)
Casignetella solitariella (Zeller, 1849)
Casignetella spiralis (Falkovitsh, 1977)
Casignetella stepposa (Falkovitsh, 1975)
Casignetella striatipennella (Nylander, 1848)
Casignetella strigiferella (Snellen, 1844)
Casignetella subtremula Anikin, 2002
Casignetella succursella (Herrich-Schäffer, 1855)
Casignetella tamara (Baldizzone, 1994)
Casignetella tanaceti (Muhlig, 1865)
Casignetella tremula Falkovitsh, 1989
Casignetella tringella (Baldizzone, 1988)
Casignetella trochilella (Duponchel, 1843)
Casignetella troglodytella (Duponchel, 1843)
Casignetella yomogiella (Oku, 1974)
Casignetella zygodon Falkovitsh, 1993
Cepurga hemerobiella (Scopoli, 1763)
Characia haloxyli Falkovitsh, 1972
Chnoocera botaurella (Herrich-Schäffer, 1861)
Chnoocera lasiocharis (Meyrick, 1931)
Chnoocera magnatella (Toll, 1959)
Coleophora albidella ([Denis & Schiffermiiller], 1775)
Coleophora bernoulliella (Goeze, 1783)
Coleophora betulella Heinemann, 1876
Coleophora currucipennella Zeller, 1839
Coleophora ibipennella Zeller, 1849
Coleophora kononenkoi Baldizzone & Savenkov, 2002
Coleophora kuehnella (Goeze, 1783)
Coleophora melanograpta Meyrick, 1934
Coleophora platyphyllae Oku, 1965
Coleophora pyrrhulipennella Zeller, 1839
Coleophora quercicola Baldizzone & Oku, 1990
Coleophora ringoniella Oku, 1959
Coleophora teregnathella Baldizzone & Savenkov, 2002
Coleophora zelleriella Heinemann, 1854
Cricotechna vitisella (Gregson, 1856)
Damophila alcyonipennella (Kollar, 1832)
Damophila deauratella (Lienig & Zeller, 1846)
Damophila frischella (Linnaeus, 1758)
Damophila mayrella (Hübner, [1813])
Damophila pustulosa Falkovitsh, 1979
Damophila trifolii Curtis, 1832
Dumitrescumia cecidophorella (Oudejans, 1972)
Dumitrescumia hydrolapathella (Hering, 1924)
Ecebalia adspersella (Benander, 1939)
Ecebalia anabaseos (Falkovitsh, 1975)
Ecebalia apythana (Falkovitsh, 1989)
Ecebalia asteris (Muhlig, 1864)
Ecebalia atriplicis (Meyrick, 1928)
Ecebalia attalicella (Zeller, 1871)
Ecebalia bagorella (Falkovitsh, 1977)
Ecebalia bajkalella (Falkovitsh, 1993)
Ecebalia boreella (Benander, 1939)
Ecebalia charadriella (Baldizzone, 1986)
Ecebalia chenopodii (Oku, 1965)
Ecebalia chumanensis Anikin, 2005
Ecebalia cinclella (Baldizzone & Oku, 1990)
Ecebalia cristata (Baldizzone, 1989)
Ecebalia eichleri (Patzak, 1977)
Ecebalia enkomiella (Baldizzone & Oku, 1988)
Ecebalia gaviaepennella (Toll, 1952)
Ecebalia halocnemi (Falkovitsh, 1994)
Ecebalia halophilella (Zimmermann, 1926)
Ecebalia halostachydis (Falkovitsh, 1994)
Ecebalia helgada Anikin, 2005
Ecebalia hungariae (Gozmány, 1955)
Ecebalia immersa (Falkovitsh, 1989)
Ecebalia irinae (Baldizzone & Savenkov, 2002)
Ecebalia kamchatica (Anikin, 1999)
Ecebalia kargani (Falkovhtsh, 1989)
Ecebalia kolymella (Falkovitsh, 1992)
Ecebalia koshmella (Falkovitsh, 1989)
Ecebalia lassella (Staudinger, 1859)
Ecebalia linosyris (Hering, 1937)
Ecebalia lunensis (Falkovitsh, 1975)
Ecebalia magyarica (Baldizzone, 1983)
Ecebalia markisaakovitshi Budashkin, 1998
Ecebalia monoceros (Falkovitsh, 1975)
Ecebalia motacillella (Zeller, 1849)
Ecebalia nomgona (Falkovitsh, 1975)
Ecebalia obscenella (Herrich-Schäffer, 1855)
Ecebalia pandionella (Baldizzone, 1988)
Ecebalia pappiferella (Hofmann, 1869)
Ecebalia parasymi Anikin, 2005
Ecebalia pinii Anikin, 2005
Ecebalia pratella (Zeller, 1871)
Ecebalia pseudolinosyris (Kasy, 1979)
Ecebalia pseudosquamosella (Baldizzone & Nel, 2003)
Ecebalia punctulatella (Zeller, 1849)
Ecebalia quadrifariella (Staudinger, 1880)
Ecebalia saxicolella (Duponchel, 1843)
Ecebalia sittella (Baldizzone, 1989)
Ecebalia squamosella (Stainton, 1856)
Ecebalia sternipennella (Zetterstedt, 1839)
Ecebalia subula Falkovitsh, 1993
Ecebalia superlonga (Falkovitsh, 1989)
Ecebalia symmicta (Falkovitsh, 1982)
Ecebalia tecta (Falkovitsh, 1989)
Ecebalia therinella (Tengstrom, 1848)
Ecebalia tornata (Falkovitsh, 1989)
Ecebalia tyrrhaenica (Amsel, 1951)
Ecebalia uniphalli Anikin, 2005
Ecebalia versurella (Zeller, 1849)
Ecebalia vestianella (Linnaeus, 1758)
Ecebalia virgaureae (Stainton, 1857)
Eupista caucasica (Stainton, 1867)
Eupista lixella (Zeller, 1849)
Eupista malatiella (Toll, 1962)
Eupista ornatipennella (Hübner, 1796)
Eupista samarensis Anikin, 2001
Frederickoenigia flavipennella (Duponchel, 1843)
Globulia cornutella (Herrich-Schäffer, 1861)
Goniodoma auroguttella (Fischer von Röslerstamm, [1841])
Goniodoma limoniella (Stainton, 1884)
Haploptilia coracipennella (Hübner, 1796)
Haploptilia drymophila Falkovitsh, 1991
Haploptilia katunella Falkovitsh, 1991
Haploptilia kroneella (Fuchs, 1899)
Haploptilia nairica Falkovitsh, 1991
Haploptilia neviusiella (Busck, 1904)
Haploptilia prunifoliae (Doets, 1944)
Haploptilia serratella (Linnaeus, 1761)
Haploptilia spinella (Schrank, 1802)
Helophorea ledi (Stainton, 1860)
Helophorea plumbella (Kanerva, 1941)
Helophorea thulea (Johansson, 1967)
Helvalbia lineolea (Haworth, 1828)
Ionescumia acerosa Falkovitsh, 1989
Ionescumia clypeiferella (Hofmann, 1871)
Ionescumia dilabens Falkovitsh, 1982
Ionescumia isomoera Falkovitsh, 1982
Ionescumia subgilva Falkovitsh, 1991
Ischnophanes monocentra Meyrick, 1891
Kasyfia binderella (Kollar, 1832)
Kasyfia obscuripalpella (Kanerva, 1941)
Kasyfia orbitella (Zeller, 1849)
Kasyfia unigenella (Svensson, 1966)
Klimeschja hospitiella (Chrétien, 1915)
Klimeschja oriolella (Zeller, 1849)
Klimeschja rudella (Toll, 1944)
Klimeschja tundrosa Falkovitsh, 1991
Klimeschja vulnerariae (Zeller, 1839)
Klinzigedia implicitella (Fuchs, 1903)
Klinzigedia onopordiella (Zeller, 1849)
Klinzigedia phlomidella (Christoph, 1862)
Klinzigedia phlomidis (Stainton, 1867)
Klinzigedia wockeella (Zeller, 1849)
Metapista stramentella (Zeller, 1849)
Metriotes lutarea (Haworth, 1828)
Multicoloria astragalella (Zeller, 1849)
Multicoloria astragalorum Falkovitsh, 1973
Multicoloria berlandella (Toll, 1956)
Multicoloria bulganella Reznik, 1974
Multicoloria caelebipennella (Zel1er, 1839)
Multicoloria caraganae (Falkovitsh, 1974)
Multicoloria cartilaginella (Christoph, 1872)
Multicoloria cavillosa Reznik, 1975
Multicoloria centralis Reznik, 1975
Multicoloria changaica Reznik, 1975
Multicoloria conspicuella (Zeller, 1849)
Multicoloria cracella (Vallot, 1835)
Multicoloria ditella (Zeller, 1849)
Multicoloria dubiella (Baker, 1888)
Multicoloria eremosparti Falkovitsh, 1974
Multicoloria flavicornis (Reznik, 1975)
Multicoloria fuscociliella (Zeller, 1849)
Multicoloria gazella (Toll, 1952)
Multicoloria halimodendri Reznik, 1989
Multicoloria honshuella (Baldizzone & Oku, 1988)
Multicoloria ignobilis Reznik, 1975
Multicoloria inconstans Reznik, 1975
Multicoloria ortrina Reznik, 1976
Multicoloria pallidata (Toll, 1959)
Multicoloria paraononidella (Amsel, 1968)
Multicoloria paraspumosella (Toll, 1957)
Multicoloria partitella (Zeller, 1849)
Multicoloria polonicella (Zeller, 1865)
Multicoloria pseudoditella (Baldizzone & Patzak, 1983)
Multicoloria remotella Reznik, 1976
Multicoloria singreni (Falkovitsh, 1973)
Multicoloria solenella (Staudinger, 1859)
Multicoloria spargospinella Reznik, 1974
Multicoloria spumosella (Staudinger, 1859)
Multicoloria stachi (Toll, 1957)
Multicoloria talynella Reznik, 1975
Multicoloria tshiligella Reznik, 1976
Multicoloria tuvensis Reznik, 1977
Multicoloria vibicella (Hübner, [1813])
Multicoloria vibicigerella (Zeller, 1839)
Multicoloria vicinella (Zeller, 1849)
Nemesia chalcogrammella (Zeller, 1839)
Oedicaula serinipennella (Christoph, 1872)
Orghidania gryphipennella (Hübner, 1796)
Orthographis albipennella (Staudinger, 1880)
Orthographis brevipalpella (Wocke, 1874)
Orthographis chamaedriella (Bruand, 1852)
Orthographis flavovena (Matsumura, 1931)
Orthographis paradoxella (Toll, 1961)
Orthographis ptarmicia (Walsingham, 1910)
Orthographis pulmonariella (Ragonot, 1874)
Orthographis serratulella (Herrich-Schäffer, 1855)
Orthographis sibirica (Filipjev, 1924)
Orthographis uralensis (Toll, 1961)
Papyrosipha ichthyura (Falkovitsh, 1976)
Papyrosipha zhusguni (Falkovitsh, 1972)
Paravalvulia spiraeella (Rebel, 1916)
Perygra adjunctella (Hodgkinson, 1882)
Perygra alticolella (Zeller, 1849)
Perygra antennariella (Herrich-Schäffer, 1861)
Perygra caespititiella (Zeller, 1839)
Perygra citrarga (Meyrick, 1934)
Perygra elodella (Baldizzone & Oku, 1988)
Perygra glaucicolella (Wood, 1892)
Perygra irinella Anikin, 1999
Perygra numeniella (Baldizzone, 1988)
Perygra okuella (Baldizzone & Savenkov, 2002)
Perygra otidipennella (Hübner, [1817])
Perygra taeniipennella (Herrich-Schäffer, 1855)
Perygra tamesis (Waters, 1929)
Phagolamia auricella (Fabricius, 1794)
Phagolamia chalepa Falkovitsh, 1993
Phagolamia serpylletorum (Hering, 1889)
Phagolamia virgatella (Zeller, 1849)
Phylloscheme glitzella (Hofmann, 1869)
Phylloscheme murinella (Tengstrom, 1847)
Plegmidia juncicolella (Stainton, 1857)
Polystrophia calligoni (Falkovitsh, 1972)
Postvinculia lutipennella (Zeller, 1838)
Protocryptis laricella (Hübner, [1817])
Protocryptis maturella (Pleshanov, 1982)
Protocryptis obducta Meyrick, 1931
Protocryptis sibiricella (Falkovitsh, 1965)
Quadratia fuscocuprella (Herrich-Schäffer, 1855)
Razowskia coronillae (Zeller, 1849)
Razowskia flaviella (Mann, 1857)
Rhamnia ahenella (Heinemann, 1876)
Scleriductia ochripennella (Zeller, 1849)
Sorbicola trigeminella (Fuchs, 1881)
Sorbicola uniformis (Oku, 1965)
Suireia adjectella (Herrich-Schäffer, 1861)
Suireia alnifoliae (Barasch, 1934)
Suireia badiipennella (Duponchel, 1843)
Suireia japonicella (Oku, 1965)
Suireia limosipennella (Duponchel, 1843)
Suireia milvipennis (Zeller, 1839)
Symphypoda parthenica (Meyrick, 1891)
Systrophoeca siccifolia (Stainton, 1856)
Systrophoeca uliginosella (Glitz, 1872)
Tolleophora asthenella (Constant, 1893)
Tollsia potentillae (Elisha, 1885)
Tollsia violacea (Strom, 1783)
Tritemachia captiosa (Falkovitsh, 1972)
Tritemachia teredo Falkovitsh, 1994
Tuberculia albitarsella (Zeller, 1849)
Valvulongia falcigerella (Christoph, 1872)
Zagulajevia gerasimovi (Toll, 1962)
Zagulajevia hemerobiola (Filipjev, 1926)
Zagulajevia tadzhikiella (Danilevsky, 1955)

Momphidae
Anybia langiella (Hübner, 1796)
Anybia nigrella Sinev, 1986
Cyphophora idaei (Zeller, 1839)
Cyphophora minorella Sinev, 1993
Cyphophora polaris Sinev, 1986
Lophoptilus miscella ([Denis & Schiffermüller], 1775)
Mompha bradleyi Riedl, 1965
Mompha confusella Koster & Sinev, 1996
Mompha conturbatella (Hübner, [1819])
Mompha divisella Herrich-Schäffer, 1854
Mompha epilobiella ([Denis & Schiffermüller], 1775)
Mompha glaucella Sinev, 1986
Mompha lacteella (Stephens, 1834)
Mompha meridionella Koster & Sinev, 2003
Mompha ochraceella (Curtis, 1839)
Mompha propinquella (Stainton, 1851)
Mompha sturnipennella (Treitschke, 1833)
Mompha subbistrigella (Haworth, 1828)
Psacaphora locupletella ([Denis & Schiffermüller], 1775)
Psacaphora ludwigiae Bradley, 1973
Psacaphora raschkiella (Zeller, 1838)
Psacaphora sexstrigella (Braun, 1921)
Psacaphora terminella (Humphreys & Westwood, 1845)

Blastobasidae
Blastobasis centralasiae Sinev, 2007
Blastobasis inouei Moriuti, 1987
Blastobasis parki Sinev, 1986
Blastobasis phycidella (Zeller, 1839)
Blastobasis ponticella Sinev, 2007
Blastobasis sprotundalis Park, 1984
Hypatopa binotella (Thunberg, 1794)
Hypatopa inunctella (Zeller, 1839)
Hypatopa moriutiella Sinev, 1986
Hypatopa segnella (Zeller, 1873)
Hypatopa silvestrella Kuznetzov, 1984
Neoblastobasis biceratala (Park, 1984)
Neoblastobasis spiniharpella Kuznetzov & Sinev, 1985
Pseudohypatopa beljaevi Sinev, 2007
Tecmerium scythrella (Sinev, 1986)

Autostichidae
Apiletria murcidella (Christoph, 1877)
Aprominta designatella (Herrich-Schäffer, 1855)
Autosticha modicella (Christoph, 1882)
Deroxena venosulella (Moschler, 1862)
Donaspastus pannonicus Gozmány, 1952
Eremicamima cedestiella (Zeller, 1868)
Euteles flavimaculata Christoph, 1882
Holcopogon bubulcellus (Staudinger, 1859)
Oegoconia deauratella (Herrich-Schäffer, 1854)
Oegoconia quadripuncta (Haworth, 1828)
Symmoca signatella Herrich-Schäffer, 1854

Amphisbatidae
Amphisbatis incongruella (Stainton, 1849)
Anchinia cristalis (Scopoli, 1763)
Anchinia daphnella ([Denis & Schiffermüller], 1775)
Anchinia grandis Stainton, 1867
Hypercallia citrinalis (Scopoli, 1763)
Periacma delegata Meyrick, 1914
Pseudatemelia elsae Svensson, 1982
Pseudatemelia flavifrontella (Denis & Schiffermüller, 1775)
Pseudatemelia josephinae (Toll, 1956)
Pseudatemelia kurentzovi Lvovsky, 2001
Pseudatemelia subochreella (Doubleday, 1859)
Telechrysis tripuncta (Haworth, 1828)

Cosmopterigidae
Alloclita mongolica Sinev, [1993]
Anatrachyntis biorrhizae Sinev, 1985
Ashibusa jezoensis Matsumura, 1931
Coccidiphila gerasimovi Danilevsky, 1950
Cosmopterix argentitegulella Sinev, 1985
Cosmopterix asignella Sinev, 1988
Cosmopterix asymmetrella Sinev, 1993
Cosmopterix chasanica Sinev, 1985
Cosmopterix ermolaevi Sinev, 1985
Cosmopterix feminella Sinev, 1988
Cosmopterix geminella Sinev, 1985
Cosmopterix gracilis Sinev, 1985
Cosmopterix infundibulella Sinev, 1988
Cosmopterix kurokoi Sinev, 1985
Cosmopterix laetificoides Sinev, 1993
Cosmopterix lienigiella Zeller, 1846
Cosmopterix maritimella Sinev, 1985
Cosmopterix omelkoi Sinev, 1993
Cosmopterix orichalcea Stainton, 1861
Cosmopterix phyladelphella Sinev, 1985
Cosmopterix rhynchognathosella Sinev, 1985
Cosmopterix sapporensis (Matsumura, 1931)
Cosmopterix schmidiella Frey, 1856
Cosmopterix scribaiella Zeller, 1850
Cosmopterix setariella Sinev, 1985
Cosmopterix sibirica Sinev, 1985
Cosmopterix splendens Sinev, 1985
Cosmopterix sublaetifica Kuroko, 1982
Cosmopterix subsplendens Sinev, 1988
Cosmopterix zieglerella (Hübner, 1810)
Diversivalva minutella Sinev, 1991
Eteobalea albiapicella (Duponchel, 1843)
Eteobalea anonymella (Riedl, 1965)
Eteobalea eurinella Sinev, 1986
Eteobalea intermediella (Riedl, 1966)
Eteobalea serratella (Treitschke, 1833)
Eteobalea tririvella (Staudinger, 1871)
Labdia citracma Meyrick, 1915
Labdia fasciella Sinev, 1993
Labdia stagmatophorella Sinev, 1993
Limnaecia phragmitella Stainton, 1851
Macrobathra nomaea Meyrick, 1914
Pancalia gaedikei Sinev, 1985
Pancalia hexachrysa (Meyrick, 1935)
Pancalia isshikii Matsumura, 1931
Pancalia leuwenhoekella (Linnaeus, 1761)
Pancalia nodosella (Bruand, 1851)
Pancalia schwarzella (Fabricius, 1798)
Pancalia sichotella Christoph, 1882
Pancalia swetlanae Sinev, 1985
Pyroderces argyrogrammos (Zeller, 1847)
Pyroderces caesaris Gozmány, 1957
Pyroderces orientella Sinev, 1993
Pyroderces sarcogypsa (Meyrick, 1932)
Ressia quercidentella Sinev, 1988
Stagmatophora heydeniella (Fischer von Röslerstamm, [1841])
Vulcaniella extremella (Wocke, 1871)
Vulcaniella grandiferella Sinev, 1986
Vulcaniella pomposella (Zeller, 1839)

Chrysopeleiidae
Ascalenia decolorella Sinev, 1984
Ascalenia vanella (Frey, 1860)
Ascalenia viviparella Kasy, 1969
Calycobathra calligoni Sinev, 1979
Calycobathra variapenella Sinev, 1984
Perimede citeriella Sinev, 1986
Perimede decimanella Sinev, 1986
Periploca palaearcticella Sinev, 1986
Sorhagenia dahurica Sinev, 1986
Sorhagenia griseella Sinev, 1993
Sorhagenia janiszewskae Riedl, 1962
Sorhagenia lophyrella (Douglas, 1846)
Sorhagenia maurella Sinev, 1993
Sorhagenia rhamniella (Zeller, 1839)
Sorhagenia riedli Sinev, 1986
Sorhagenia vicariella Sinev, 1993

Gelechiidae
Acompsia bidzilyai Huemer & Karsholt, 2002
Acompsia caucasella Huemer & Karsholt, 2002
Acompsia cinerella (Clerck, 1759)
Acompsia maculosella (Stainton, 1851)
Acompsia schmidtiellus (Heyden, 1848)
Acompsia subpunctella Svensson, 1966
Acompsia tripunctella ([Denis & Schiffermüller], 1775)
Agnippe albidorsella (Snellen, 1884)
Agnippe echinuloides Bidzilya & H.H. Li, 2010
Agnippe novisyrictis (Li, 1993)
Agnippe pseudolella (Christoph, 1888)
Agnippe syrictis (Meyrick, 1936)
Agnippe zhouzhiensis (Li, 1993)
Agonochaetia impunctella (Caradja, 1920)
Agonochaetia intermedia Sattler, 1968
Agonochaetia lvovskyi Bidzilya, 2001
Agonochaetia tuvella Bidzilya, 2000
Altenia inscriptella (Christoph, 1882)
Altenia perspersella (Wocke, 1862)
Altenia scriptella (Hilbner, 1796)
Anacampsis anisogramma (Meyrick, 1927)
Anacampsis blattariella (Hübner, 1796)
Anacampsis cincticulella (Herrich-Schäffer, 1854)
Anacampsis fuscella (Eversmann, 1844)
Anacampsis homoplasta (Meyrick, 1932)
Anacampsis lignaria (Meyrick, 1926)
Anacampsis mongolicae Park, 1988
Anacampsis obscurella ([Denis & Schiffermüller], 1775)
Anacampsis okui Park, 1988
Anacampsis populella (Clerck, 1759)
Anacampsis scintillella (Fischer von Röslerstamm, [1841])
Anacampsis solemnella (Christoph, 1882)
Anacampsis temerella (Lienig & Zeller, 1846)
Anacampsis timidella (Wocke, 1887)
Ananarsia bipinnata (Meyrick, 1932)
Ananarsia eleagnella (Kuznetzov, 1957)
Ananarsia lineatella (Zeller, 1839)
Anarsia bimaculata Ponomarenko, 1989
Anarsia sibirica Park & Ponomarenko, 1996
Anarsia spartiella (Schrank, 1802)
Anarsia stepposella Ponomarenko, 2002
Anasphaltis renigerella (Zeller, 1839)
Angustialata gemmellaformis Omelko, 1988
Apodia bifractella (Duponchel, 1843)
Aproaerema anthyllidella (Hübner, [1813])
Aproaerema longihamata Li, 1993
Argolamprotes micella ([Denis & Schiffermüller], 1775)
Aristotelia baltica A. Šulcs & I. Šulcs, 1983
Aristotelia brizella (Treitschke, 1833)
Aristotelia calastomella (Christoph, 1872)
Aristotelia coeruleopictella (Caradja, 1920)
Aristotelia decoratella (Staudinger, 1879)
Aristotelia decurtella (Hübner, [1813])
Aristotelia drosocrypta Meyrick, 1926
Aristotelia ericinella (Zeller, 1839)
Aristotelia mirabilis (Christoph, 1888)
Aristotelia pancaliella (Staudinger, 1871)
Aristotelia subdecurtella (Stainton, 1859)
Aristotelia subericinella (Duponchel, 1843)
Aristotelia varia Omelko, 1999
Aroga aristotelis (Millière, 1876)
Aroga flavicomella (Zeller, 1839)
Aroga genuina Omelko, 1999
Aroga gozmanyi Park, 1991
Aroga mesostrepta (Meyrick, 1932)
Aroga pascuicola (Staudinger, 1871)
Aroga trilineella (Chambers, 1877)
Aroga velocella (Zeller, 1839)
Athrips adumbratella Snellen, 1884
Athrips amoenella (Frey, 1882)
Athrips aquila Junnilainen, 2010
Athrips bidzilyai Junnilainen, 2010
Athrips kerzhneri Piskunov, 1990
Athrips kostjuki Bidzilya, 2005
Athrips mouffetella (Linnaeus, 1758)
Athrips nigricostella (Duponchel, 1842)
Athrips nigrogrisea (Kolmakova, 1958)
Athrips patockai (Povolny, 1979)
Athrips polymaculella Park, 1991
Athrips pruinosella (Lienig & Zeller, 1846)
Athrips rancidella (Hemch-Schaffer, 1854)
Athrips sibirica Bidzilya, 2005
Athrips spiraeae (Staudinger, 1871)
Athrips stepposa Bidzilya, 2005
Athrips tetrapunctella (Thunberg, 1794)
Atremaea exstans (Meyrick, 1926)
Atremaea lonchoptera Staudinger, 1871
Aulidiotis bicolor Moriuti, 1977
Bagdadia claviformis (Park, 1993)
Bagdadia gnomia (Ponomarenko, 1995)
Battaristis majuscula Omelko, 1993
Battaristis minuscula Omelko, 1993
Brachmia blandella (Fabricius, 1798)
Brachmia dimidiella ([Denis & Schiffermüller], 1775)
Brachmia inornatella (Douglas, 1850)
Brachmia procursella Rebel, 1903
Brachmia vialis Omelko, 1999
Bryotropha affinis (Haworth, 1828)
Bryotropha basaltinella (Zeller, 1839)
Bryotropha boreella (Douglas, 1851)
Bryotropha desertella (Douglas, 1850)
Bryotropha galbanella (Zeller, 1839)
Bryotropha nupponeni Karsholt & Rutten, 2005
Bryotropha parapurpurella Bidzilya, 1998
Bryotropha plantariella (Tengstrom, 1848)
Bryotropha purpurella (Zetterstedt, 1839)
Bryotropha rossica Anikin & Piskunov, 1996
Bryotropha senectella (Zeller, 1839)
Bryotropha similis (Stainton, 1854)
Bryotropha svenssoni Park, 1984
Bryotropha terrella ([Denis & Schiffermüller], 1775)
Bryotropha umbrosella (Zeller, 1839)
Carpatolechia aenigma (Sattler, 1983)
Carpatolechia alburnella (Zeller, 1839)
Carpatolechia daehania (Park, 1993)
Carpatolechia decorella (Haworth, 1812)
Carpatolechia epomidella (Tengstrom, 1869)
Carpatolechia filipjevi (Lvovsky & Piskunov, 1993)
Carpatolechia fugacella (Zeller, 1839)
Carpatolechia fugitivella (Zeller, 1839)
Carpatolechia fuscoalata (Omelko, 1993)
Carpatolechia nigricantis (Omelko, 1993)
Carpatolechia notatella (Hübner, [1813])
Carpatolechia proximella (Hübner, 1796)
Caryocolum alsinella (Zeller, 1868)
Caryocolum amaurella (M. Hering, 1924)
Caryocolum blandella (Douglas, 1852)
Caryocolum blandelloides Karsholt, 1981
Caryocolum cassella (Walker, 1864)
Caryocolum fischerella (Treitschke, 1833)
Caryocolum huebneri (Haworth, 1828)
Caryocolum junctella (Douglas, 1851)
Caryocolum kroesmanniella (Herrich-Schäffer, 1854)
Caryocolum leucomelanella (Zeller, 1839)
Caryocolum mongolense Povolny, 1969
Caryocolum oculatella (Thomann, 1930)
Caryocolum petrophila (Preissecker, 1914)
Caryocolum petryi (Hofmann, 1899)
Caryocolum proxima (Haworth, 1828)
Caryocolum pullatella (Tengstrom, 1848)
Caryocolum repentis Huemer & Luquet, 1992
Caryocolum schleichi (Christoph, 1872)
Caryocolum tischeriella (Zeller, 1839)
Caryocolum trauniellum (Zeller, 1868)
Caryocolum tricolorella (Haworth, 1812)
Caryocolum vicinella (Douglas, 1851)
Caryocolum viscariella (Stainton, 1855)
Catatinagma kraterella Junnilainen & Nuppoen, 2010
Catatinagma trivittellum Rebel, 1903
Caulastrocecis furfurella (Staudinger, 1871)
Caulastrocecis interstratella (Christoph, 1872)
Caulastrocecis perexigella Junnilainen, 2010
Chionodes aprilella Huemer & Sattler, 1995
Chionodes borzella Bidzilya, 2000
Chionodes caucasicella Huemer & Sattler, 1995
Chionodes continuella (Zeller, 1839)
Chionodes distinctella (Zeller, 1839)
Chionodes electella (Zeller, 1839)
Chionodes flavipalpella Huemer & Sattler, 1995
Chionodes fumatella (Douglas, 1850)
Chionodes holosericella (Herrich-Schäffer, 1854)
Chionodes ignorantella (Herrich-Schäffer, 1854)
Chionodes luctuella (Hübner, 1793)
Chionodes lugubrella (Fabricius, 1794)
Chionodes mongolica Piskunov, 1979
Chionodes nubilella (Zetterstedt, 1839)
Chionodes praeclarella (Herrich-Schäffer, 1854)
Chionodes sagayica (Kodak, 1986)
Chionodes soella Huemer & Sattler, 1995
Chionodes tannuolella (Rebel, 1917)
Chionodes tantella Huemer & Sattler, 1995
Chionodes tragicella (Heyden, 1865)
Chionodes ukokensis Bidzilya, 2005
Chionodes viduella (Fabricius, 1794)
Chionodes violacea (Tengstrom, 1848)
Chorivalva bisaccula Omelko, 1988
Chorivalva grandialata Omelko, 1988
Chorivalva unisaccula Omelko, 1988
Chrysoesthia drurella (Fabricius, 1775)
Chrysoesthia eppelsheimi (Staudinger, 1885)
Chrysoesthia falkovitshi Lvovsky & Piskunov, 1989
Chrysoesthia sexguttella (Thunberg, 1794)
Chrysoesthia tuvella Bidzilya, 2005
Cnaphostola angustella Omelko, 1984
Cnaphostola biformis Omelko, 1984
Cnaphostola venustalis Omelko, 1984
Coloptilia conchylidella (Hofmann, 1898)
Concubina euryzeucta (Meyrick, 1922)
Cosmardia moritzella (Treitschke, 1835)
Crossobela trinotella (Herrich-Schäffer, 1856)
Dactylotula kinkerella (Snellen, 1876)
Daltopora felixi Povolny, 1979
Daltopora sinanensis Sakamaki, 1995
Deltophora korbi (Caradja, 1920)
Dendrophilia albidella (Snellen, 1884)
Dendrophilia caraganella Ponomarenko, 1993
Dendrophilia leguminella Ponomarenko, 1993
Dendrophilia mediofasciana (Park, 1991)
Dendrophilia neotaphronoma Ponomarenko, 1993
Dendrophilia petrinopsis (Meyrick, 1935)
Dendrophilia solitaria Ponomarenko, 1993
Dendrophilia unicolorella Ponomarenko, 1993
Dichomeris alacella (Zeller, 1839)
Dichomeris barbella ([Denis & Schiffermüller], 1775)
Dichomeris beljaevi Ponomarenko, 1998
Dichomeris bulawskii Ponomarenko & Park, 1996
Dichomeris chinganella (Christoph, 1882)
Dichomeris christophi Ponomarenko & Mey, 2002
Dichomeris consertella (Christoph, 1882)
Dichomeris cuspis Park, 1994
Dichomeris derasella ([Denis & Schiffermüller], 1775)
Dichomeris harmonias Meyrick, 1922
Dichomeris heriguronis (Matsumura, 1931)
Dichomeris imperviella Ponomarenko & Omelko, 2003
Dichomeris juniperella (Linnaeus, 1761)
Dichomeris kuznetzovi Ponomarenko, 1998
Dichomeris latipennella (Rebel, 1937)
Dichomeris lespedezae Park, 1994
Dichomeris limosellus (Schlager, 1849)
Dichomeris litoxyla Meyrick, 1937
Dichomeris liui (Li & Zheng, 1996)
Dichomeris lucistrialella Ponomarenko & Omelko, 2003
Dichomeris magnimaculata Ponomarenko & Omelko, 2003
Dichomeris marginella (Fabricius, 1781)
Dichomeris minutia Park, 1994
Dichomeris oceanis Meyrick, 1920
Dichomeris okadai (Moriuti, 1982)
Dichomeris polypunctata Park, 1994
Dichomeris praevacua Meyrick, 1922
Dichomeris pusilella Ponomarenko & Omelko, 2003
Dichomeris qinlingensis (Li & Zheng, 1996)
Dichomeris rasilella (Herrich-Schäffer, 1854)
Dichomeris silvania Ponomarenko & Omelko, 2003
Dichomeris silvestrella Ponomarenko, 1998
Dichomeris sparsella (Christoph, 1882)
Dichomeris syndyas Meyrick, 1926
Dichomeris ustalella (Fabricius, 1794)
Dichomeris vernariella Bidzilya, 1998
Dichomeris vixidistinctella Ponomarenko & Omelko, 2003
Dirhinosia cervinella (Eversmann, 1844)
Encolapta catarina (Ponomarenko, 1994)
Encolapta subtegulifera (Ponomarenko, 1994)
Encolapta tegulifera (Meyrick, 1932)
Ephysteris deserticolella (Staudinger, 1870)
Ephysteris insulella (Heinemann, 1870)
Ephysteris inustella (Zeller, 1847)
Ephysteris promptella (Staudinger, 1859)
Ephysteris subovatus (Povolny, 2001)
Ephysteris tenuisaccus Nupponen, 2010
Epidola stigma Staudinger, 1859
Eulamprotes atrella ([Denis & Schiffermüller], 1775)
Eulamprotes libertinella (Zeller, 1872)
Eulamprotes plumbella (Heinemann, 1870)
Eulamprotes superbella (Zeller, 1839)
Eulamprotes unicolorella (Duponchel, 1843)
Eulamprotes wilkella (Linnaeus, 1758)
Exoteleia dodecella (Linnaeus, 1758)
Faristenia acerella Ponomarenko, 1991
Faristenia furtumella Ponomarenko, 1991
Faristenia geminisignella Ponomarenko, 1991
Faristenia maritimella Ponomarenko, 1991
Faristenia nemoriella Ponomarenko, 1998
Faristenia omelkoi Ponomarenko, 1991
Faristenia quercivora Ponomarenko, 1991
Faristenia ussuriella Ponomarenko, 1991
Filatima angustipennis Sattler, 1961
Filatima autocrossa (Meyrick, 1936)
Filatima bidentella Bidzilya, 1998
Filatima djakovica Anikin & Piskunov, 1996
Filatima fontisella Lvovsky & Piskunov, 1989
Filatima incomptella (Herrich-Schäffer, 1854)
Filatima nigrimediella Bidzilya, 1998
Filatima pallipalpella (Snellen, 1884)
Filatima sciocrypta (Meyrick, 1926)
Filatima spurcella (Duponchel, 1843)
Filatima tephriditella (Duponchel, 1844)
Filatima transsilvanella Z. Kovács & S. Kovács, 2001
Filatima zagulajevi Anikin & Piskunov, 1996
Gelechia albomaculata Omelko, 1986
Gelechia anomorcta Meyrick, 1926
Gelechia atlanticella (Amsel, 1955)
Gelechia atrofusca Omelko, 1986
Gelechia basipunctella Herrich-Schäffer, 1854
Gelechia clandestina Omelko, 1986
Gelechia cuneatella Douglas, 1852
Gelechia fuscooculata Omelko, 1986
Gelechia hippophaella (Schrank, 1802)
Gelechia inconspicua Omelko, 1986
Gelechia jakovlevi Krulikowsky, 1905
Gelechia muscosella Zeller, 1839
Gelechia nigra (Haworth, 1828)
Gelechia notabilis Omelko, 1986
Gelechia rhombella ([Denis & Schiffermüller], 1775)
Gelechia rhombelliformis Staudinger, 1871
Gelechia sabinellus (Zeller, 1839)
Gelechia scotinella Herrich-Schäffer, 1854
Gelechia senticetella (Staudinger, 1859)
Gelechia sestertiella Herrich-Schäffer, 1854
Gelechia sirotina Omelko, 1986
Gelechia sororculella (Hübner, [1817])
Gelechia teleiodella Omelko, 1986
Gelechia turpella ([Denis & Schiffermüller], 1775)
Gladiovalva badidorsella (Rebel, 1935)
Gnorimoschema bodillum Karsholt & Nielsen, 1974
Gnorimoschema epithymellum (Staudinger, 1859)
Gnorimoschema herbichii (Nowicki, 1864)
Gnorimoschema jalavai Povolny, 1994
Gnorimoschema mikkolai Povolny, 1994
Gnorimoschema nordlandicolella (Strand, 1902)
Gnorimoschema robustella (Staudinger, 1871)
Gnorimoschema steueri Povolny, 1975
Gnorimoschema streliciella (Herrich-Schäffer, 1854)
Gnorimoschema valesiella (Staudinger, 1877)
Harpagidia magnetella (Staudinger, 1870)
Hedma karsholti Nupponen, 2010
Helcystogramma albinervis (Gerasimov, 1929)
Helcystogramma arulensis (Rebe1, 1929)
Helcystogramma claripunctella Ponomarenko, 1998
Helcystogramma compositaepictum (N.Omelko & Omelko, 1993)
Helcystogramma flavescens Junnilainen, 2010
Helcystogramma flavilineolella Ponomarenko, 1998
Helcystogramma ineruditum (Meyrick, 1926)
Helcystogramma lineolella (Zeller, 1839)
Helcystogramma lutatella Hemch-Schhffer, 1854)
Helcystogramma perelegans (N.Omelko & Omelko, 1993)
Helcystogramma rufescens (Haworth, 1828)
Helcystogramma triannulella (Herrich-Schäffer, 1854)
Holcophora statices Staudinger, 1871
Hypatima excellentella Ponomarenko, 1991
Hypatima rhomboidella (Linnaeus, 1758)
Hypatima venefica Ponomarenko, 1991
Iridesna rutilella (Snellen, 1884)
Isophrictis anthemidella (Wocke, 1871)
Isophrictis striatella (Denis & Schiffermüller, 1775)
Istrianis brucinella (Mann, 1872)
Ivanauskiella psamathias (Meyrick, 1891)
Iwaruna biguttella (Duponchel, 1843)
Kiwaia kostjuki Povolny, 2001
Kiwaia palaearctica Povolny, 1968
Klimeschiopsis discontinuella (Rebel, 1899)
Klimeschiopsis kiningerella (Duponchel, 1843)
Lutilabria kaszabi Povolny, 1978
Lutilabria lutilabrella (Mann, 1857)
Lutilabria prolata Junnilainen & Nupponen, 2010
Lutilabria volgensis Anikin & Piskunov, 1996
Megacraspedus albovenata Junnilainen, 2010
Megacraspedus argyroneurellus Staudinger, 1876
Megacraspedus attritellus Staudinger, 1871
Megacraspedus balneariellus (Chrétien, 1907)
Megacraspedus binotellus (Duponchel, 1843)
Megacraspedus dolosellus (Zeller, 1839)
Megacraspedus fallax (Mann, 1867)
Megacraspedus lagopellus Herrich-Schäffer, 1860
Megacraspedus leuca (Filipjev, 1929)
Megacraspedus litovalvellus Junnilainen, 2010
Megacraspedus longipalpella Junnilainen, 2010
Megacraspedus multispinella Junnilainen & Nupponen, 2010
Megacraspedus niphorrhoa (Meyrick, 1926)
Megacraspedus orenburgensis Junnilainen & Nupponen, 2010
Megacraspedus separatellus (Fischer von Röslerstamm, [1843])
Mesophleps oxycedrella (Milliere, 1871)
Mesophleps silacella (Hübner, 1796)
Metanarsia dahurica Bidzilya, 2005
Metanarsia guberlica Nupponen, 2010
Metanarsia incertella (Herrich-Schäffer, 1861)
Metanarsia modesta Staudinger, 1871
Metanarsia onzella Christoph, 1887
Metanarsia scythiella Ponomarenko, 2000
Metzneria aestivella (Zeller, 1839)
Metzneria aprilella (Herrich-Schäffer, 1854)
Metzneria artificella (Herrich-Schäffer, 1861)
Metzneria diffusella Englert, 1974
Metzneria ehikeella Gozmány, 1954
Metzneria filia Piskunov, 1979
Metzneria inflammatella (Christoph, 1882)
Metzneria kerzhneri Piskunov, 1979
Metzneria lappella (Linnaeus, 1758)
Metzneria littorella (Douglas, 1850)
Metzneria metzneriella (Stainton, 1851)
Metzneria neuropterella (Zeller, 1839)
Metzneria paucipunctella (Zeller, 1839)
Metzneria santolinella (Amsel, 1936)
Metzneria subflavella Englert, 1974
Mirificarma cytisella (Treitschke, 1833)
Mirificarma eburnella ([Denis & Schiffermüller], 1775)
Mirificarma lentiginosella (Zeller, 1839)
Mirificarma maculatella (Hilbner, 1796)
Mirificarma mulinella (Zeller, 1839)
Monochroa conspersella (Herrich-Schäffer, 1854)
Monochroa cytisella (Curtis, 1837)
Monochroa divisella (Douglas, 1850)
Monochroa elongella (Heinemann, 1870)
Monochroa ferrea (Frey, 1870)
Monochroa hornigi (Staudinger, 1883)
Monochroa inflexella Svensson, 1992
Monochroa lucidella (Stephens, 1834)
Monochroa lutulentella (Zeller, 1839)
Monochroa moyses Uffen, 1991
Monochroa nomadella (Zeller, 1868)
Monochroa palustrella (Douglas, 1850)
Monochroa parvulata Gozmány, 1957
Monochroa pessocrossa (Meyrick, 1926)
Monochroa rufulella (Snellen, 1884)
Monochroa rumicetella (Hofmann, 1868)
Monochroa saltenella (Benander, 1928)
Monochroa sepicolella (Herrich-Schäffer, 1854)
Monochroa servella (Zeller, 1839)
Monochroa simplicella (Lienig & Zeller, 1846)
Monochroa suffusella (Douglas, 1850)
Monochroa tenebrella (Hübner, [1817])
Monochroa tetragonella (Stainton, 1885)
Monochroa uralensis Junnilainen, 2010
Neofaculta ericetella (Geyer, 1832)
Neofaculta infernella (Herrich-Schäffer, 1854)
Neofaculta taigana Ponomarenko, 1998
Neofriseria caucasicella Sattler, 1960
Neofriseria kuznetzovae Bidzilya, 2002
Neofriseria mongolinella Piskunov, 1987
Neofriseria peliella (Treitschke, 1835)
Neofriseria sceptrophora (Meyrick, 1926)
Neofriseria singula (Staudinger, 1876)
Nothris lemniscella (Zeller, 1839)
Nothris verbascella ([Denis & Schiffermüller], 1775)
Nuntia incognitella (Caradja, 1920)
Ornativalva heluanensis (Debski, 1913)
Ornativalva mixolitha (Meyrick, 1918)
Ornativalva ornatella Sattler, 1967
Ornativalva plutelliformis (Staudinger, 1859)
Ornativalva sieversi (Staudinger, 1871)
Parachronistis albiceps (Zeller, 1839)
Parachronistis conjunctionis Omelko, 1986
Parachronistis fumea Omelko, 1986
Parachronistis incerta Omelko, 1986
Parachronistis jiriensis Park, 1985
Parachronistis juglandeti Omelko, 1986
Parachronistis maritima Omelko, 1986
Parachronistis sellaris Park, 1985
Paranarsia joannisiella Ragonot, 1895
Parapodia sinaica (Frauenfeld, 1859)
Parastenolechia argobathra (Meyrick, 1935)
Parastenolechia collucata (Omelko, 1988)
Parastenolechia nigrinotella (Zeller, 1847)
Parastenolechia superba (Omeiko, 1988)
Pexicopia malvella (Hübner, [1805])
Photodotis adornata Omelko, 1993
Photodotis palens Omelko, 1993
Phthorimaea operculella (Zeller, 1873)
Phthorimaea practicolella (Christoph, 1872)
Piskunovia reductionis Omelko, 1988
Platyedra subcinerea (Haworth, 1828)
Pogochaetia dmitrii Bidzilya, 2005
Polyhymno attenuata (Omelko, 1993)
Polyhymno celata (Omelko, 1993)
Polyhymno corylella (Omelko, 1993)
Polyhymno fusca (Omelko, 1993)
Polyhymno fuscobasis (Omelko, 1993)
Polyhymno indistincta (Omelko, 1993)
Polyhymno obliquata (Matsumura, 1931)
Polyhymno pontifera (Meyrick, 1934)
Polyhymno subocellea (Stephens, 1834)
Polyhymno trapezoidella (Caradja, 1920)
Polyhymno trichoma (Caradja, 1920)
Prolita sexpunctella (Fabricius, 1794)
Prolita solutella (Zeller, 1839)
Protoparachronistis concolor Omelko, 1986
Protoparachronistis discedens Omelko, 1986
Protoparachronistis initialis Omelko, 1986
Protoparachronistis policapitis Omelko, 1993
Psamathocrita osseella (Stainton, 1861)
Pseudotelphusa acrobrunella (Park, 1992)
Pseudotelphusa paripunctella (Thunberg, 1794)
Pseudotelphusa scalella (Scopoli, 1763)
Psoricoptera arenicolor Omelko, 1999
Psoricoptera gibbosella (Zeller, 1839)
Psoricoptera speciosella Teich, 1892
Ptocheuusa abnormella (Herrich-Schäffer, 1854)
Ptocheuusa inopella (Zeller, 1839)
Ptocheuusa paupella (Zeller, 1847)
Ptocheuusa sublutella Christoph, 1872
Pyncostola bohemiella (Nickerl, 1864)
Recurvaria comprobata (Meyrick, 1935)
Recurvaria leucatella (Clerck, 1759)
Recurvaria nanella ([Denis & Schiffermüller], 1775)
Recurvaria toxicodendri Kuznetzov, 1979
Scrobipalpa acuminatella (Sircom, 1850)
Scrobipalpa adaptata (Povolný, 2001)
Scrobipalpa arenbergeri Povolny, 1973
Scrobipalpa artemisiella (Treitschke, 1833)
Scrobipalpa atriplicella (Fischer von Röslerstamm, [1841])
Scrobipalpa bezengensis (Povolny, 2001)
Scrobipalpa bidzilyai (Povolry, 2001)
Scrobipalpa brahmiella (Heyden, 1862)
Scrobipalpa brandti Povolny, 1972
Scrobipalpa bryophiloides Povolny, 1966
Scrobipalpa chitensis (Povolny, 2001)
Scrobipalpa chrysanthemella (Hofmann, 1867)
Scrobipalpa clintoni Povolny, 1968
Scrobipalpa costella (Humphreys & Westwood, 1845)
Scrobipalpa disjectella (Staudinger, 1859)
Scrobipalpa dorsoflava (Povolný, 1996)
Scrobipalpa erichi Povolny, 1964
Scrobipalpa ferruginosa (Povolny, 2001)
Scrobipalpa filia Povolny, 1969
Scrobipalpa fraterna Povolny, 1969
Scrobipalpa frugifera Povolny, 1969
Scrobipalpa gallicella (Constant, 1885)
Scrobipalpa gregori Povolny, 1967
Scrobipalpa grisea Povolny, 1969
Scrobipalpa halonella (Herrich-Schäffer, 1854)
Scrobipalpa hannemanni Povolny, 1966
Scrobipalpa heretica Povolny, 1973
Scrobipalpa hyoscyamella (Stainton, 1869)
Scrobipalpa hypothetica Povolny, 1973
Scrobipalpa indignella (Staudinger, 1879)
Scrobipalpa intima (Povolny, 2001)
Scrobipalpa klimeschi Povolny, 1967
Scrobipalpa kyrana (Povolny, 2001)
Scrobipalpa lagodes (Meyrick, 1926)
Scrobipalpa lutea Povolný, 1977
Scrobipalpa magnificella Povolný, 1967
Scrobipalpa maniaca Povolny, 1969
Scrobipalpa murinella (Duponchel, 1843)
Scrobipalpa nitentella (Fuchs, 1902)
Scrobipalpa notata (Povolný, 2001)
Scrobipalpa obsoletella (Fischer von Röslerstamm, [1841])
Scrobipalpa ocellatella (Boyd, 1858)
Scrobipalpa optima (Povolny, 2001)
Scrobipalpa phagnalella (Constant, 1895)
Scrobipalpa pinosa (Povolny, 2001)
Scrobipalpa plesiopicta Povolný, 1969
Scrobipalpa proclivella (Fuchs, 1886)
Scrobipalpa pseudobsoletella (Povolny & Gregor, 1955)
Scrobipalpa pulchra Povolný, 1967
Scrobipalpa punctata (Povolný, 1996)
Scrobipalpa rebeli (Preissecker, 1914)
Scrobipalpa rjabovi Piskunov, 1990
Scrobipalpa salinella (Zeller, 1847)
Scrobipalpa samadensis (Pfaffenzeller, 1870)
Scrobipalpa similis Povolny, 1973
Scrobipalpa spumata (Povolny, 2001)
Scrobipalpa subnitens Povolny, 1969
Scrobipalpa tenebrata (Povolny, 2001)
Scrobipalpa usingeri Povolny, 1969
Scrobipalpa ustulatella (Staudinger, 1871)
Scrobipalpa vasconiella (Rossler, 1877)
Scrobipalpula diffluella (Frey, 1870)
Scrobipalpula psilella (Herrich-Schäffer, 1854)
Scrobipalpula ramosella (Muller-Rutz, 1934)
Scrobipalpula tussilaginis (Stainton, 1867)
Sergeya temulenta (Omelko, 1998)
Sitotroga cerealella (Olivier, 1789)
Sophronia cassignatella Herrich-Schäffer, 1854
Sophronia chilonella (Treitschke, 1833)
Sophronia consanguinella (Herrich-Schäffer, 1855)
Sophronia gelidella Nordman, 1941
Sophronia humerella ([Denis & Schiffermüller], 1775)
Sophronia iciculata Omelko, 1999
Sophronia marginella Toll, 1936
Sophronia semicostella (Hübner, [1813])
Sophronia sicariellus (Zeller, 1839)
Spiniphallellus desertus Bidzilya & Karsholt, 2008
Stegasta abdita Park & Omelko, 1994
Stenoalata macra Omelko, 1998
Stenolechia gemmella (Linnaeus, 1758)
Stenolechia notomochla Meyrick, 1935
Stomopteryx bolschewikiella (Caradja, 1920)
Stomopteryx detersella (Zeller, 1847)
Stomopteryx lineolella (Eversmann, 1844)
Stomopteryx mongolica Povolny, 1975
Stomopteryx orthogonella (Staudinger, 1871)
Stomopteryx remissella (Zeller, 1847)
Streyella anguinella (Herrich-Schäffer, 1861)
Syncopacma albifrontella (Heinemann, 1870)
Syncopacma altaica Bidzilya, 2005
Syncopacma azosterella (Herrich-Schäffer, 1855)
Syncopacma captivella (Herrich-Schäffer, 1854)
Syncopacma centralis Piskunov, 1979
Syncopacma cinctella (Clerck, 1759)
Syncopacma cincticulella (Bruand, 1850)
Syncopacma coronillella (Treitschke, 1833)
Syncopacma incognitana Gozmány, 1957
Syncopacma karvoneni (Hackman, 1950)
Syncopacma kutsherenkoi Bidzylya, 1998
Syncopacma larseniella Gozmány, 1957
Syncopacma linella (Chrétien, 1904)
Syncopacma montanata Gozmány, 1957
Syncopacma ochrofasciella (Toll, 1936)
Syncopacma polychromella (Rebel, 1902)
Syncopacma sangiella (Stainton, 1863)
Syncopacma semicostella (Staudinger, 1870)
Syncopacma steppicolella Junnilainen, 2010
Syncopacma suecicella (Wolff, 1958)
Syncopacma taeniolella (Zeller, 1839)
Syncopacma vinella (Bankes, 1898)
Syncopacma wormiella (Wolff, 1958)
Teleiodes bradleyi Park, 1992
Teleiodes flavimaculella (Herrich-Schäffer, 1854)
Teleiodes kaitilai Junnilainen, 2010
Teleiodes linearivalvata (Moriuti, 1977)
Teleiodes luculella (Hübner, [1813])
Teleiodes murina (Omelko, 1998)
Teleiodes orientalis Park, 1992
Teleiodes paraluculella Park, 1992
Teleiodes saltuum (Zeller, 1878)
Teleiodes simplificata Omelko, 1995
Teleiodes vulgella ([Denis & Schiffermüller], 1775)
Teleiodes wagae (Nowicki, 1860)
Teleiopsis diffinis (Haworth, 1828)
Tenera vittata Omelko, 1998
Trichembola unimaculata Omelko, 1993
Xenolechia aethiops (Humphreys & Westwood, 1845)
Xystophora carchariella (Zeller, 1839)
Xystophora kostjuki Bidzilya, 2000
Xystophora mongolica Emelyanov & Piskunov, 1982
Xystophora orthogonella (Staudinger, 1870)
Xystophora psammitella (Snellen, 1884)
Xystophora pulveratella (Herrich-Schäffer, 1854)

References 

Moths